"Homer Is Where the Art Isn't" is the twelfth episode of the twenty-ninth season of the American animated television series The Simpsons, and the 630th episode of the series overall. It aired in the United States on Fox on March 18, 2018. It is the final episode written by long time writer Kevin Curran, who died in 2016. The episode is dedicated to Stephen Hawking, who died four days before the episode's airing.

Plot
At Gavelby's Auction House, Homer and Mr. Burns lose to tech mogul Megan Matheson at bidding for Joan Miró's painting The Poetess, with which Homer is obsessed, to the point of attempting to steal the painting at the end of the auction. Once the painting arrives at her home, Megan finds out that it has been stolen. Polish-American Detective Manacek is called to solve the case.

Manacek accuses Megan due to her insuring the painting for double the price she paid of $30 million. She denies the accusation and sends Manacek to Burns' mansion. He shows he cannot stand losing a bid to a woman, but dismisses the accusation too and sends Manacek to the final suspect, Homer, due to the obsession he showed about it. Homer demonstrates to him how much he wants the painting at the Power Plant, but denies stealing it. In the evening, Marge shows up at Manacek's apartment Brick Townhomes to convince him Homer is innocent, but he says they would only talk at dinner. So Marge invites him to dinner at her house with their family.

After dinner, Homer panics when they start talking, and Bart and Marge explain how Homer became obsessed with the painting at the Springfield Museum of Fine Arts while chaperoning a field trip there, even dreaming about it at night. Lisa then reveals that Homer confided in her about the painting, forming a common interest between them. The two then went to the museum, only to find it closed due to being out of funds and the painting shipped off to an auction house. Springfielders protested on the museum's closure while Mayor Quimby explained the cuts, including the cut of 1/3 of the Springfield Police Department with Eddie having been fired, resulting in them giving up on the protests. Homer then decided to enter the auction in a bid to save the painting, where the scene returns to the start of the episode where the bids took place, and Homer tried to steal it.

After the story, Homer escapes from home, but Manacek finds him at the museum where he assures him he is innocent because he finds him too dumb to steal anything. Manacek later gathers all the suspects together in the museum and reveals that Megan and Burns are the thieves of the painting. Megan exchanged the security guards by twins hired by her, to simulate the steal, so she could collect the insurance policy for her girlfriend. However, Burns beat her to it when he built an identical auction house next to the original and stole it from the vault.

After Megan and Burns are arrested and the painting is retrieved from Burns' manor, Manacek reveals the true culprit to be none other than Lisa herself, as the painting is nothing other than her tote bag. Lisa explains that she secretly switched the painting before the auction happened, so it would not go to millionaires' houses hidden away from people who love it, like Homer. As ownership of the painting reverts to the city, it is returned to Mayor Quimby, who chooses to preserve it at the Springfield Arena Football Arena, built with the money from selling the public arts, where Homer and Lisa happily go to view the painting together.

During the credits, there are different shots of Manacek as if they are part of a detective TV show.

Reception
Dennis Perkins of The A.V. Club gave this episode a B, stating, "At this point in its record-setting run, The Simpsons is entitled—encouraged, even—to muck about with its format all it wants. Here, the series’ traditional linear sitcom storytelling style is upended, from the classic theme song right on through. Starting out with Homer, fancy duds and ping pong paddle at the ready, bidding millions of dollars for Joan Miró's abstract painting The Poetess, being outbid by first Mr. Burns and then ‘billionaire tech mogul’ Megan Matheson (Cecily Strong), and, enraged, being dragged out by security bellowing, ‘Don’t take that painting, I love it’—clearly, there's a mystery here. Both as to the hows and whys of Homer J. Simpson being involved in high-end art intrigue, and to what form this rejiggering of the Simpsons formula is taking. It's neat."

"Homer Is Where the Art Isn't" scored a 0.8 rating with a 3 share and was watched by 2.10 million people, making it Fox's second-highest-rated show of the night.

Retired Akron Beacon Journal writer Rich Heldenfels called the episode "a dead-on parody of Banacek."

References

External links
 

2018 American television episodes
The Simpsons (season 29) episodes
Joan Miró